Cem Yalçın Yıldırım (born 8 July 1961)  is a Turkish mathematician who specializes in number theory. He obtained his B.Sc from Middle East Technical University in Ankara, Turkey and his PhD from the University of Toronto in 1990. His advisor was John Friedlander. He is currently a faculty member at Boğaziçi University in Istanbul, Turkey.

In 2005(), with Dan Goldston and János Pintz, he proved, that for any positive number ε there exist primes p and p′ such that the difference between p and p′ is smaller than ε log p.

Formally;

where pn denotes the nth prime number. In other words, for every c > 0, there exist infinitely many pairs of consecutive primes pn and pn+1 which are closer to each other than the average distance  between consecutive primes by a factor of c, i.e., pn+1 − pn < c log pn.

This result was originally reported in 2003 by Dan Goldston and Cem Yıldırım but was later retracted. Then Janos Pintz joined the team and they completed the proof in 2005.

In fact, if they assume the Elliott–Halberstam conjecture, then they can also show that primes within 16 of each other occur infinitely often, which is related to the twin prime conjecture.

See also

Landau's problems

References

External links
 

20th-century Turkish mathematicians
21st-century Turkish mathematicians
1961 births
Living people
Number theorists
Institute for Advanced Study visiting scholars
University of Toronto alumni